Lior Refaelov (or Rafaelov, ; born 26 April 1986) is an Israeli professional footballer who plays as an attacking midfielder or as a winger for Belgian First Division A club Anderlecht.

He began his career at Maccabi Haifa, where he won the Israeli Premier League three times. In 2011, he transferred to Club Brugge for €2.5 million. With the Belgian side, he won two first division titles in 2016 and 2018 and scored the winning goal in the Belgian Cup final in 2015.

Refaelov made his senior international debut in 2007, and has since earned 40 caps and scored 6 goals for the Israel national team.

Early and personal life
Refaelov was born in Or Akiva, Israel, to Mountain Jewish (Kavkazim) parents who immigrated from Derbent, Dagestan to Israel prior to his birth.

He married his Israeli girlfriend Gal ( Aviv) in 2012.

Club career
In 1998, Refaelov began to play in Maccabi Haifa youth teams. In the 2002–03 season he moved up from the under-16 team to the youth team of the club, and scored in his first match against Neve Yossef.

During the 2003–04 season he scored 7 goals in the youth team, lead it to the youth championship and won the best player award.

Maccabi Haifa 
Refaelov scored his first goal in the senior during the 2005–06 season on a penalty kick against Hapoel Nazareth Illit, a game which Haifa won 6–0.

In the 2008–09 season, he finished with 9 goals as Maccabi Haifa won the Israeli league championship for the 11th time.

At the conclusion of the 2010–11 season, he was voted 'Player of the Year' in the Israeli football.

Club Brugge

On 20 June 2011, Refaelov signed with Belgian Pro League side Club Brugge for a fee of €4 million euro and 15% from the next sale.

In his first season with the Brugge he scored 7 goals and made 9 assists in all club competition as the club finished as runners-up in the Belgian league. In the next season, Refalov had a great form as he scored 12 goals and made 10 assists. In the 2013–14 season he scored 5 goals and made 14 assists and was one of the most valuable players of the club as they finished third in the league.

On 6 November 2014, he scored a hat-trick as Brugge won 4–0 away to FC Copenhagen to go top of their UEFA Europa League group.

On 22 March 2015, he scored with an added-time volley the winning goal in the Belgian Cup final, as Brugge defeated Anderlecht for their first trophy in eight years.

A year later he repeated the feat, scoring in the 2016 Belgian Cup Final, however this time around Club Brugge lost the final 1–2 to Standard Liège. That same season, he helped Club Brugge win their first league title in 11 years, making 15 league appearances as the club edged out Gent in the final days of the campaign.

Royal Antwerp 
On 30 August 2018, Refaelov joined fellow Belgian First Division A side Royal Antwerp on an initial season-long loan. He scored his first goal for the club in a 5–1 league victory over Zulte Waregem on 16 September. On 9 December, Refaelov netted twice in a 3–0 victory over Cercle Brugge K.S.V., moving within four points of league leaders Genk through 18 matches.

In May 2019, Refaelov made his move to Antwerp permanent, signing a contract with the club until 2021. On 1 August 2020, Refaelov scored the only goal in a 1–0 win over his former team Club Brugge in the 2020 Belgian Cup Final. On 29 October 2020, he scored the only goal in a 1–0 win over Tottenham Hotspur in the 2020–21 UEFA Europa League.

In January 2021, he was awarded with the Belgian Golden Shoe for 2020. He became the third Antwerp player to win the Golden Boot and the first since Wilfried Van Moer in 1966. Refaelov collected 271 points from the 196 ballots, ahead of Beerschot midfielder Raphael Holzhauser (187) and the prolific Genk striker Paul Onuachu (86).

Anderlecht 
On 26 April 2021, it was announced that Refaelov would move to Belgian First Division A side Anderlecht on 1 July, signing a two-year contract. On 5 December 2021, Refaelov scored a brace in a 3–2 home win against Zulte Waregem.

International career
Refaelov represented Israel in the 2003 UEFA European Under-17 Championship in Portugal, scoring his international youth side's only goal in the tournament in a 1–2 loss to England U-17 on 7 May 2003.

As part of the Israel U-21, he won the Valeri Lobanovsky Memorial Tournament 2006.

He made his debut for the Israeli senior national side in an friendly against Belarus on 22 August 2007, replacing Idan Tal for the last nine minutes of a 1–2 away defeat. His next appearance came in another friendly match on 27 May 2010, against Uruguay at the Estadio Centenario in Montevideo; he scored the equaliser in a 1–4 away defeat.

On 15 March 2022, Refaelov announced his retirement from the Israel national team.

Career statistics

Club

International
Scores and results list Israel's goal tally first, score column indicates score after each Refaelov goal.

Honours

Club
Maccabi Haifa
Israeli Premier League: 2005–06, 2008–09, 2010–11
Israel Toto Cup (Ligat Ha'Al): 2005–06

Club Brugge
Belgian Pro League: 2015–16, 2017–18 
Belgian Cup: 2014–15
Belgian Super Cup: 2016

Royal Antwerp
Belgian Cup: 2019–20

Individual
Footballer of the Year in Israel: 2010–11
Belgian Pro League Player of the Month: March 2014
Belgian Golden Shoe: 2020

See also

List of Jewish footballers
List of Jews in sports
List of Israelis

References

External links

 
 

1986 births
Living people
Israeli Mizrahi Jews
Israeli footballers
Maccabi Haifa F.C. players
Club Brugge KV players
Royal Antwerp F.C. players
R.S.C. Anderlecht players
Israeli Premier League players
Belgian Pro League players
Israeli people of Mountain Jewish descent
Israeli expatriate footballers
Expatriate footballers in Belgium
Israeli expatriate sportspeople in Belgium
People from Or Akiva
Israel youth international footballers
Israel under-21 international footballers
Association football midfielders
Association football wingers
Israel international footballers
Jewish footballers
Israeli Footballer of the Year recipients